McKinley Classical Leadership Academy (also known as McKinley High School) is a magnet middle and high school for gifted and talented students in St. Louis, Missouri. It is part of the St. Louis Public Schools district. McKinley opened in 1904 as the first comprehensive public high school in south St. Louis and closed in 1988. The school has been operating as a magnet middle school since the 1990s. It reopened as a high school in 2007. It graduated nine students in May of 2011.

Notable alumni
 Jo Jo White – Naismith Memorial Basketball Hall of Famer, attended while the school was a public high school

References

High schools in St. Louis
Magnet schools in St. Louis
Public high schools in Missouri
School buildings completed in 1904
1904 establishments in Missouri
Buildings and structures in St. Louis